Volmer Thomsen (31 October 1917 – 28 October 2000) was a Danish gymnast. He competed at the 1948 Summer Olympics and the 1952 Summer Olympics.

References

External links
 

1917 births
2000 deaths
Danish male artistic gymnasts
Olympic gymnasts of Denmark
Gymnasts at the 1948 Summer Olympics
Gymnasts at the 1952 Summer Olympics
People from Horsens
Sportspeople from the Central Denmark Region